Jeju National Museum is a national museum located in Jeju, South Korea. It opened on June 15, 2001. Construction of the museum began in December 1992 and ended on December 28 2000. The museum primarily focuses on the archaeology and history of Jeju, South Korea. The museum also specializes in Tamna and the maritime culture of Jeju.

Construction
38.6 billion south korean won was invested to construct the building for the museum.

Content

See also
List of museums in South Korea
Dol hareubang

References

External links
 Jeju National Museum Official site 
 Jeju National Museum at Google Cultural Institute

National museums of South Korea
Museums in Jeju Province
Museums established in 2001